Macho Callahan is a 1970 Mexican-American Western film directed by Bernard L. Kowalski and starring David Janssen, Jean Seberg, Lee J. Cobb and James Booth. The screenplay concerns a Union soldier who is imprisoned in a Confederate prison camp during the American Civil War. He manages to escape, but is pursued by a gang of bounty hunters.

Plot
Placed behind bars during the war, Diego Callahan, also known as "Macho," travels to Texas looking for the man responsible for his imprisonment.

He quarrels with a one-armed Confederate Army colonel, David Mountford, over a bottle of champagne and kills him in front of his wife, Alexandra. Vowing vengeance, she immediately puts a $1,000 bounty on Callahan's head. She entices Duffy, who wears the yellow boots that Callahan remembers him by, to help her seek out Callahan.

Traveling with Alexandra through Confederate Texas, Duffy locates Callahan and challenges him to a game of horseshoes for money, but when Alexandra seeks Duffy, she finds that Callahan has hanged him.

Alexandra goes to work at a casino run by Harry Wheeler, writing letters for illiterate cowboys. Wheeler agrees to hire a team of bounty hunters and give chase. Alexandra spots Callahan at the casino, and befriends a young cowboy, Yancy. She convinces him that her honor has been insulted. Yancy goes over to where Callahan is playing poker and a melee breaks out. He escapes in the confusion but she pursues Callahan on her own and meets up with him, and the two travel with Callahan's partner.

Later, in Callahan's cabin, Alexandra tries to kill him, but Callahan overpowers her and savagely beats her before raping her. Despite the savage beating leaving scars on her face, Alexandra decides to stay at the cabin. After nearly being killed by a mother bear protecting her cub, she is saved by Callahan, who shoots the adult bear. He saves the cub because it won't survive on its own. She falls in love with Callahan.

Now in love with the man who has killed her husband, she travels with Callahan and his partner, but Wheeler's posse is in pursuit. Wheeler's men are determined to collect that reward, and Callahan finds that he can't kill them all.

Cast

See also
 List of American films of 1970

References

External links

1970 films
Films scored by Patrick Williams
Films directed by Bernard L. Kowalski
1970 Western (genre) films
Embassy Pictures films
American Western (genre) films
Mexican Western (genre) films
1970s English-language films
1970s American films
1970s Mexican films
English-language Mexican films